Calliostoma modestulum is a species of sea snail, a marine gastropod mollusk in the family Calliostomatidae.

Description
The height of the shell attains 13 mm.

Distribution
This species occurs in the Atlantic Ocean off Argentina, the Falkland Islands and Tierra del Fuego at depths between 66 m and 251 m.

References

 Strebel, H. 1908. Die Gastropoden (mit Ausnahme de nackten Opisthobranchier). Wissenschaftliche Ergebnisse der Schwedischen Südpolar-Expedition 1901-1903 6(1): 111 pp., 6 pls.

External links
 To Antarctic Invertebrates
 To Biodiversity Heritage Library (5 publications)
 To Encyclopedia of Life
 To USNM Invertebrate Zoology Mollusca Collection
 To World Register of Marine Species
 

modestulum
Gastropods described in 1908